Faysel Kasmi (born 31 October 1995) is a Belgian professional footballer who plays as a central midfielder.

Club career

Early career
Kasmi played for Rapid AC, Germinal Beerschot and Academie Jean-Marc Guillou in his youth career before his first professional move.

Lierse SK
In 2014 Kasmi joined Belgian Premier League side Lierse. Kasmi made his top flight debut at 7 December 2013 against Gent in a 1–3 home defeat.

Standard Liége (loan)
In 2015 Kasmi made a surprise loan move to Standard Liège. He only made 4 league appearances before leaving.

AC Omonia (loan)
After his loan spell with Standard Liége expired Kasmi joined AC Omonia of Cyprus in 2016.

Waterford FC
In 2018 Kasmi joined League of Ireland Premier Division side Waterford on a one-year deal. Kasmi was given the number 10 shirt for the season. Kasmi made his debut for Waterford on 23 March in their 2–1 victory over Shamrock Rovers. Kasmi scored his first and second goals for Waterford in a 3–0 win over Bray Wanderers. Kasmi left Waterford in June 2018 after making 12 appearances and scoring 2 goals as he transferred to Beerschot Wilrijk for an undisclosed fee.

KFCO Beerschot Wilrijk
In June 2018 Kasmi signed for Beerschot Wilrijk.

Cherno More Varna
Kasmi became part of Bulgarian club Cherno More's team in August 2020.

References

External links
 

1995 births
Living people
Association football midfielders
Belgian footballers
Belgian expatriate footballers
Lierse S.K. players
Standard Liège players
AC Omonia players
Waterford F.C. players
K Beerschot VA players
PFC Cherno More Varna players
Belgian Pro League players
Challenger Pro League players
First Professional Football League (Bulgaria) players
Belgian sportspeople of Moroccan descent
Place of birth missing (living people)
Expatriate footballers in Cyprus
Expatriate association footballers in the Republic of Ireland